Sigurd Hauso Haugen (born 17 July 1997) is a Norwegian professional footballer who plays as a forward for Danish Superliga club Aarhus GF.

Career
On 7 July 2022, Haugen signed a five-year contract with Danish Superliga club Aarhus GF. He made his competitive debut on 17 July, playing the full game as AGF lost 1–0 to Brøndby on the opening matchday of the 2022–23. On 24 July, he scored his first goal for the club in a 3–1 win at home against Viborg, as he also provided an assist. In December 2022, a news media revealed that Haugen had been arrested by the police in Aarhus after getting into an argument with a doorman in front of a disco. However, Haugen was not charged and was released the following day.

Career statistics

References

External links
Sigurd Haugen at NFF

1997 births
Living people
Norwegian footballers
Norwegian expatriate footballers
Association football forwards
Sportspeople from Rogaland
People from Haugesund
Eliteserien players
Norwegian First Division players
Challenger Pro League players
Danish Superliga players
Sandnes Ulf players
Odds BK players
Sogndal Fotball players
Royale Union Saint-Gilloise players
Aalesunds FK players
Aarhus Gymnastikforening players
Expatriate footballers in Belgium
Expatriate men's footballers in Denmark
Norwegian expatriate sportspeople in Belgium
Norwegian expatriate sportspeople in Denmark